Jean Maximilien Alcibiades Derneville DeBlanc (September 16, 1821November 8, 1883) was a lawyer and state legislator in Louisiana. He served as a colonel for the Confederate army during the American Civil War. Afterward, he founded the Knights of the White Camelia, a white insurgent militia that operated from 1867-69 to suppress freedmen's voting, disrupt Republican Party political organizing and try to regain political control of the state government in the 1868 election. A Congressional investigation overturned 1868 election results in Louisiana.

But DeBlanc continued to oppose the Reconstruction effort; he was influential in commanding 600 men to oppose the disputed election of Governor William Pitt Kellogg in 1874 and try to seat the Democrats. He was briefly arrested and held by U.S. Marshals. In 1876 he was appointed by Democratic governor Francis T. Nicholls as a Louisiana Supreme Court Justice after white Democrats regained political control in the state.

Early life and family
Jean Maximilien Alcibiades Derneville DeBlanc was born in 1821 in St. Martinville, Louisiana. He was the great-great-grandson of Louis Juchereau de St. Denis, founder of Natchitoches, Louisiana. DeBlanc had French ancestors, whose descendants had been in Louisiana since the early colonial period.

Civil War
A lawyer and former state legislator, DeBlanc enlisted June 19, 1861, at Camp Moore, Louisiana. He was captain of Company C in the Eighth Louisiana Infantry, which became attached to the Army of Northern Virginia. He was promoted to major in 1862 and then lieutenant colonel at Fredericksburg, Virginia, on April 6, 1863. He was captured at Banks Ford May 4, 1863, and paroled at Old Capitol Prison in Washington a short time later.

He was present at the Battle of Gettysburg in July, 1863 where he assumed command of a regiment when the regiment's commander was killed. He suffered an arm wound and was promoted to the rank of colonel July 2, 1863, by Confederate President Jefferson Davis. Upon returning to Louisiana in 1864, he commanded Confederate reserve troops at Natchitoches. He surrendered to Union General Francis J. Herron in June 1865 and aided Herron in maintaining order in the former Confederate areas of Louisiana until Union forces arrived.

Knights of the White Camelia
DeBlanc was the founder and commander (from 1867-1868) of the Knights of the White Camelia.  This was an insurgent group founded to oppose the implementation of Congressional Reconstruction in Louisiana; it was similar to chapters of Ku Klux Klan and later paramilitary groups in Louisiana and other states. The goal of the Knights of the White Camelia was victory for the Democratic party, by whatever means necessary, in the presidential election of November 1868. This was achieved. More votes were counted for the Democratic candidate, Horatio Seymour, than there were registered Democratic voters in the state. Due to the widespread violence and intimidation tactics against blacks in the effort to suppress freedmen's voting, in addition to electoral fraud, a congressional investigation resulted in overturning the results of the 1868 election in Louisiana.

The Knights of the White Camelia were no longer active after the 1868 election, but other paramilitary groups arose to carry on an insurgency with the goal of regaining political control. The White League in Louisiana and the Red Shirts and White-Liners in Mississippi used similar intimidation tactics in the 1870s against Republicans. Elections were surrounded by violence and fraud.

DeBlanc also continued to oppose the Reconstruction effort; he was influential in commanding 600 men to oppose the disputed election of Governor William Kellogg in 1874. His forces were among thousands of armed white militia in what was called the Battle of Liberty Place who opposed Metropolitan troops in New Orleans, then the seat of government. They took control of the legislature and major buildings for three days before retreating in advance of federal troops. DeBlanc was briefly arrested and held by US Marshals but was never charged. He was considered a hero and known as the "King of the Cadiens" (Acadians).

In 1877, DeBlanc was appointed by Democratic governor Francis T. Nicholls as a Louisiana Supreme Court Justice after white Democrats regained political control in the state. Federal troops were withdrawn soon after. He served January 9, 1877, to April 5, 1880, his service being ended by the passage of a new constitution changing the structure of the court. DeBlanc returned to St. Martinville.

He died in 1883 at the age of 62.

References

Confederate States Army officers
1821 births
1883 deaths
Louisiana Democrats
People from St. Martinville, Louisiana
People from Franklin, Louisiana
American white supremacists
People of Louisiana in the American Civil War
Justices of the Louisiana Supreme Court
Members of the Louisiana State Legislature
Louisiana lawyers
19th-century American politicians
19th-century American lawyers
19th-century American judges
American people of French descent